The Ardière (also Ardières) is a river in the Rhône department of France. The Ardière is one of the tributaries of the Saône, which flows from the mountains of Beaujolais.

Geography

The Ardière flows into the Saône just before Montmerle island, opposite Montmerle-sur-Saône. The river valley there is the location of the D37 route départementale.

Departement and communes traversed
The Ardière flows through one departement (Rhône) and 10 communes, listed from upstream to downstream as follows:
Les Ardillats, Saint-Didier-sur-Beaujeu, Beaujeu, Lantignié, Quincié-en-Beaujolais, Régnié-Durette, Cercié, Saint-Lager, Saint-Jean-d'Ardières and Taponas.

Tributaries
The Ardière has eleven tributary streams and two branches.
Tributaries are listed below, from upstream to downstream. R indicates a right tributary, L indicates a left tributary.

Toponyms
Local placenames related to the Ardière hydronym include the commune of Saint-Jean-d'Ardières and the commune of the river's source, Les Ardillats.

Ecology
Along the Ardière there are many fragile species, including the martin-pêcheur bird, the Bouvière fish, and fresh-water mussels of the Anodonta genus. One can also find two families of dragonfly (Gomphidae and  Aeshnidae) as well as a damselfly, the Mercury Bluet.

Flora include the swamp ragwort and the flowering rush.

Facilities
The zone of the Ardière's drainage basin has been recognised as likely to benefit from a reduction in pollution by pesticides and runoff from viticulture as well as homes and communities. The Rhône-Alpes region launched and tender for the years 2003–2006.

See also
 List of rivers of France

Notes and references

External links
  Association for Management and Environmental Monitoring of the Formans

Rivers of France
Rivers of Auvergne-Rhône-Alpes
Rivers of Rhône (department)